Uncle Moishy and the Mitzvah Men is a Jewish American children's educational entertainment group based in New York City, featured in audio and video releases, as well as appearing live in concert. Their tapes, CDs and videos are sold in most Jewish music and Judaica stores.

Uncle Moishy has traveled internationally, giving shows in Israel, Canada, England, Austria, South Africa and Hong Kong.

Lead musicians and singers Moshe Tanenbaum and Yossi Berktin are Hasidic Orthodox Jews who play "Uncle Moishy" and lead the "Mitzvah Men" in song and verse that expresses the observant religious lifestyle of Orthodox Judaism. They focus on the religious aspects of Judaism that most easily relate to young children, such as the laws of Shabbat, kashrut and the giving of charity, as well as the good deeds of Pirkei Avot (Ethics of Our Fathers), such as helping others and being nice.

Origins
Uncle Moishy began in Toronto, Ontario, Canada in 1975, In 1979 his first album appeared in conjunction with the Jewish Education Program. The original band members were Tanenbaum, Zale Newman, and Chaim Shainhouse; Shainhouse left early on, though he composed for and sang on the first few albums. Uncle Moishy is produced and managed by the Suki and Ding company. The group has produced 22 audio albums and 14 videos to date.

Currently
In 2017, Moshe Tenenbaum under new management, producers known as Sonic Duo, released his first solo album titled 'Welcome'. 
In 2018, the 'All New Uncle Moishy' Yossi Berktin, with producers Suki and Ding released the character's 19th album.

In 2021, Moshe Tenenbaum in collaboration with Artscroll and Doni Gross released an 11-song album entitled We Are So Special and a children's book.

References

External links
 

American children's musical television series
Religious educational television series
Orthodox Judaism
Jewish musical groups
Television series about Jews and Judaism
Hasidic Judaism in New York City
Musical groups established in 1979
Canadian children's musical groups
American children's musical groups
1979 establishments in Ontario